Collegium Nobilium may refer to:
 Collegium Nobilium (Olomouc), a college established in 1725 in Olomouc, Moravia.
 Collegium Nobilium (Warsaw), an elite boarding secondary school for sons of magnates and wealthy gentry (szlachta), founded in 1740 in Warsaw by Stanisław Konarski.
 Collegium Nobilium, a college established by the Jesuit order in Warsaw operating 1752 - 1777. 
 Collegium Nobilium (Paris), School of Polish Language and Culture founded in February 2012. Is also the name of Polish Scouts group at the same school.

See also
 Collegium Nordicum, a papal seminary established by the University of Olomouc in 1578 and by the Collegium Hosianum in 1581.